DDT (or ДДТ in Cyrillic) is a popular Russian rock band founded by its lead singer and the only remaining original member, Yuri Shevchuk (Юрий Шевчук), in Ufa (Bashkir ASSR, RSFSR) in 1980. The band was named after the pesticide DDT. 

They are one of the better known and most prolific Russian bands of the late 20th and early 21st centuries.

History

Ufa period (1980-1985)
The band was formed in 1980 in Ufa, Bashkir ASSR and originally consisted of five members:
 Yuri Shevchuk — vocals, guitar
 Vladimir Sigachyov — keyboard
 Rustem Asanbayev — guitar
 Gennady Rodin — bass
 Rustam Karimov — percussion

In 1982, the Komsomolskaya Pravda paper sponsored a competition for young musicians called Zolotoy Kamerton (lit. 'Golden Tuning Fork'). DDT submitted three compositions - "Inoplanetyane" (Aliens), "Chyornoye solntse" (Black Sun), and "Ne streliai!" (Don't Shoot!). During the long-running competition, the group published their first album (on tape), Svinya na raduge (Pig on a Rainbow). The album contained elements of rock and roll, blues and country music.  During this time, popular music in the former Soviet Union was split between sanctioned "official" performers who were admitted to the musicians' union, and underground artists.  Such underground artists were often highly trained musicians who also had other jobs. A complex underground network evolved in the 1980s and "unofficial" music became widely distributed (although the compensation for the artists was very limited), by "magnitizdat", i.e., in a similar way to the underground channels that had existed for non-state sanctioned literature (samizdat). Such "underground" artists became widely known, and their unofficial albums were sometimes mentioned in the press.  In the 1980s, DDT straddled the line between underground and sanctioned artists, but was close to the underground in their musical, lyrical, and performing styles.

DDT's submission to Zolotoy Kamerton reached the final round of the competition and the group was invited to perform in concert at Moscow's Orlyonok complex, together with the other finalist, Rok-sentyabr (Rock-September) from Cherepovets. DDT and three members of Rock-September, Vyacheslav Kobrin, Yevgeny Belozyorov and Andrey Maslennikov, soon produced a collaborative album (on tape), Monolog v Saigone (Monologue in Saigon), later renamed Kompromiss (Compromise). After recording the album, Sigachyov and Shevchuk returned to Ufa.

Sigachyov distanced himself from the group, while Shevchuk recruited new members including Rodin, drummer Sergey Rudoy, guitarist Rustam Rezvanov and keyboard player Vladislav Senchillo.

In May 1983, DDT successfully performed at the Luzhniki Stadium in Moscow, as part of a three-day, sanctioned festival, "Rok za mir" (Rock for Peace). Their performance, however, was edited out of the official television program covering the event.

The new collective produced the album Periferia (Periphery) in April 1984. After recording this album, some members of the group landed on a KGB watch list and were subjected to government persecution. The band's music was banned, forcing them to go underground. Ironically, this served to increase their popularity among young Russian music fans.

Although they never considered themselves political activists, Shevchuk always felt it his duty as a citizen and a songwriter to address not only the strengths but the weaknesses of his country's government, a dangerous stance to take in the former Soviet Union. DDT continued to work as a "non-conformist" group, producing albums and giving concerts throughout the Soviet Union. This was no easy feat, as they received little if any money for the records they produced during this period, and very little for their concerts. Like other dissident artists, they survived through a combination of cleverness, perseverance, and unofficial help from their fan base.

Shevchuk spent some time in Sverdlovsk (present-day Yekaterinburg), performing with the group Urfin Juis. In November 1985, DDT covertly recorded the album Vremya (Time) in Moscow with additional musicians, but the recording process was very difficult.

1986-1997

In 1986, Shevchuk moved to Leningrad (now Saint Petersburg) with his wife, son and mother. The move helped him to establish himself at the forefront of the Russian rock scene as St. Petersburg was a center of a musical resurgence. In 1987, he recreated DDT. Its new members included:
Vadim Kurilev — bass
Andrei "Skinny" Vasiliev — guitar
Igor Dotsenko — drums
Nikita "Zoltsman" Zaitsev — violin, guitar
Mikhail "Uncle Misha" Chernov — saxophone
Andrey Muratov — keyboards

On January 23, 1987, the new lineup debuted on the stage of the Leningrad Rock Club. In June 1987, DDT performed at the "Leningrad Rock Festival" in front of a crowd of 3,000 crammed into a venue with a capacity of 1,000.

In the summer of 1988, DDT toured across Russia and recorded a new album, Ya poluchil etu rol (I was given this role), which contained some songs from their old albums re-recorded in a professional studio. In 1988, the band also made their first visit to the U.S.; their concert in Los Angeles was covered by MTV.

In 1989, they went on tour with the band Alisa, performing at a rock festival in Hungary. In 1990, DDT performed several concerts in the U.S. and Japan. Also in 1990 DDT released Ottepel (Thaw), which presented the band's first concert from St. Petersburg. They also participated in a Viktor Tsoi tribute concert, after the renowned singer-songwriter died in a car accident on August 15, 1990.

After the Soviet Union's collapse in 1991, DDT attracted an even greater following both at home and abroad, as their albums and concerts began to be broadcast and publicized more widely. In 1991, DDT recorded another album, the stark and keyboard-heavy Plastun (A crawling soldier, originally the name of Cossack infantrymen), but after many months of work Shevchuk decided to shelve it and the album was not released until 1995, four years later.

In 1992 DDT released the album Aktrisa Vesna (Spring the Actress). This lyrical album, which was dedicated to Shevchuk's deceased wife, Elmira, met with great success. It contained some of the band's greatest hits, include "Shto takoe osen'" (What is autumn), "Dozhd'" (Rain), and "Rodina" (Motherland). After releasing the album, the band toured extensively. Soon afterwards the group began to change their sound and performance strategy by adding "programmes" - conceptually prepared concerts - to its repertoire. During December 1992 and January 1993, DDT presented its first program, Chyorny Pyos Peterburg (Black Mongrel Petersburg), and toured widely in CIS countries. On May 27, 1993, on the anniversary of the founding of St. Petersburg, DDT performed a free concert in Dvortsovaya Square. 120,000 people attended.

In the beginning of 1994, a new album, Eto vsyo… (That's all…), was recorded. The musicians had planned to make a double album, however, because of challenging deadlines and the instability of the lineup, a significant amount of early musical material and recordings did not make it into the final version. Years later, these songs would be included in the band's Rozhdyonny v SSSR (Born in the USSR) album.

During the summer of 1994, DDT took part in the rock festival White Nights of St. Petersburg in Berlin. That autumn, the group was awarded the prestigious Ovatsiya award (Ovation) for Best Rock Group of the Year. Yuri Shevchuk was also named Best Rock Musician of the Year.

In January 1995, during First Chechen War, Shevchuk went on a peace mission to Chechnya, where he performed 50 concerts for Russian troops and Chechen citizens alike. On June 25, 1995, DDT performed a 15th anniversary concert in Petrovsky stadium, attracting an audience of tens of thousands of fans. Afterwards, the group toured with its newest programme, Ot i do (From and to). At the end of the winter of 1995–1996, the group spent time working in a recording studio in the United States.

In February–March 1996, DDT recorded a new album, Lyubov (Love), at Long View Farm in Massachusetts with two new musicians: bassist I. Tikhomirov (from the group Kino) and keyboard player D. Galitsky.

In the summer of 1996, upon their return from the United States, the group headlined several festivals, including VladiROCKstok, the first large-scale international music festival in the formerly closed city of Vladivostok on the Sea of Japan.

1998-2004

In May 1998, the band released a new album titled Mir nomer nol' (World number zero) - a concept album which contained influences from industrial music and relied heavily on electronic, computer-generated music. With this program DDT lost some of their old fans but found a huge success among younger listeners - which Shevchuk and DDT were very pleased by. The "Mir nomer nol'" tour included about 70 cities in Russia and overseas. A new album, Metel' avgusta (Snowstorm of August), contained mostly outtakes from Mir nomer nol as well as more lyrical songs.

Since then, the band has won a number of Russian music awards and been awarded humanitarian citations for their creative and charitable work. Shevchuk and his group also regularly travel throughout the C.I.S. and other former Soviet republics giving benefit concerts: in the spring and summer of 2002, 10 out of 11 concerts the band played were benefits for various social and cultural organizations. The band has transcended Russia, reaching an ever-growing audience in the U.S. and Europe, and for the past 20 years have traveled frequently throughout the world, playing concerts and gaining new fans with their unique sound. Shevchuk's music and lyrics are not only influenced by traditional "western" rock music, but also by the entire scope of Russian folk, classical, and religious music. In many respects, Shevchuk's initial years of struggle as an underground musicians shaped his and, by extension, the band's philosophy toward their art. The question of the music's marketability was never part of the song writing process as there was no "market" in which to compete but only an allegiance to the purity of artistic expression.

In 2002 and 2003 DDT released a double album called Yedinochestvo (Loneliness/Singleness). That duologue was even more experimental  then Mir nomer nol. After the following tour, Vadim Kurilev, the band's guitarist and bass-guitarist from its original Piter line-up, left a group to begin a solo career. One of Kurilev's last performances as DDT member was released on the CD and DVD Gorod bez okon (A city without windows).

2005-present

In 2005, DDT celebrated their 25th anniversary with an extended tour throughout Russia, Europe, and North America, and the release of a new album entitled Propavshiy bez vesti (Vanished without a trace), which received critical acclaim.

In 2007 DDT released the album Prekrasnaya lyubov (Beautiful love), a collection of previously unreleased songs which had been performed by the group for many years in addition to several new songs. The album differs from previous albums, representing a greater focus on political and social themes versus the more common ideas in their other albums. Many songs are in the chanson style.

On March 3, 2008, DDT performed at the Dissenters' March in St. Petersburg to protest the controversial election of Dmitry Medvedev as President of Russia.  Subsequently, in May 2010 Shevchuk received considerable media attention following a pointed dialogue with Prime Minister Vladimir Putin in which he openly confronted him (on state television) with questions regarding such controversial topics as democracy, freedom of speech, assembly, and freedom of the press in Russia.

On September 24 and 26, 2008, DDT presented an anti-war program called Ne strelyay! (Don't Shoot!). These concerts (featuring bands from Georgia, South Ossetia and Ukraine) were dedicated to the casualties of wars, particularly victims of the war in South Ossetia. The concert in Petersburg was shown on TV by Channel 5 without commercial breaks.

In the summer of 2009, DDT participated in the "Rok nad Volgoy" festival ("Rock above the Volga") in Samara and in the international music festival "Sotvorenie mira" ("World creation") in Kazan. On September 2, 2009, the band performed on VVC Square to protest the demolition of historical buildings in Moscow.

By the time DDT began to record its next studio album, Shevchuk was the only member left from its original Petersburg line-up. He brought together a brand new team:
 Konstantin "The Cat" Shumailov - keyboards;
 Alex Fedichev - lead guitar;
 Artyom Mamay - drums, vibraphone;
 Roman Nevelev - bass;
 Anton Vishnyakov - trombone, tambourine, shaker;
 Alena Romanova - backing vocals

In 2011, DDT released the concept album Inache (Otherwise). According to Shevchuk, the album's central theme is freedom in all its forms and the lyrical hero is a Prince Hamlet of the 21st century which has no doubt regarding the question "To be, or not to be?". He clearly knows: "To be!", but the question remains - "In which way?"

The band embarked on a large, successful tour which lasted from 2011 to 2014. On April 5, 2012, DDT released a film titled Nebo pod serdtsem (The Sky Under the Heart) a compilation of behind-the-scenes and concert footage from the band's performance at the "Olympic Stadium". This was the first multiple-camera concert films made in Russia. Later that year, the band took part in the rock festival The Best City UA in Dnepropetrovsk. In 2013, the band toured in Germany, performing at Tempodrom in Berlin and at Grugahalle in Essen. A concert in Essen was later released on CD+DVD in 2014.

DDT always was and still is one of the most popular rock groups in Russia, and their concerts typically attract tens of thousands of fans. Shevchuk put together the first incarnation of the band in the summer of 1980, and although its members have changed over the years, he continues to voice the concerns and frustrations of the Russian people in his music today just as he did in the band's infancy. The more than 20 albums in DDT's discography not only chronicle the history of a rock group, but also provide poignant narratives that examine many aspects of life in the Soviet Union and Russia during the past 35 years.

Members

Current Members
Yuriy Shevchuk – vocals,acoustic guitar, 12-string guitar, guitar, poems,main musical themes (1980–present)
Konstantin Shumailov – keyboards, samplers, programming, backing vocals (1996–present)
Alexey Fedichev – lead guitar,mandolin, ukulele, backing vocals (2003–present)
Pavel Dodonov – guitar (2020–present)
Artem Mamay – drums, vibraphone,bass guitar, keyboards (2010–present)
Roman Nevelev - bass guitar (2011–present)
Anton Vishnyakov – trombone, backing vocals, tambourine, shaker (2010–present)
Alyona Romanova – backing vocals, voice, vocalis, kaluka (2010–present)

Former Members
Rinat Shamsutdinov - drums (1979–1980)
Rustem Asanbayev - guitar (1979-1983)
Gennady Rodin - bass guitar (1979–1984)
Vladimir Sigachev - keyboards (1979–1987)
Rustem Karimov - drums (1981–1983)
Niyaz Abdyushev - bass (1984–1986)
Sergei Rudoy - drums (1984–1986)
Sergey Letov - saxophone (1985-1987)
Sergey Ryzhenko – guitar, violin, keyboards, recorder (1985, 1994–1995)
Andrey Vasiliev - guitar (1986–1998)
Vadim Kurylev – guitar, bass guitar, recorder, harmonica, balalaika, accordion, organ (1986–2002)
Igor Dotsenko – drums (1986–2010)
Nikita Zaitsev – guitar, violin (1987–2000)
Andrey Muratov - keyboards, organ (1987–1993)
Igor Tikhomirov — bass guitar, sitar (1995–1998)
Mikhail Chernov – saxophone, flute, bass clarinet, svirel, kurai (1988–2010)
Pavel Borisov – bass guitar, double bass (1998–2011)
Ivan Vasiliev – trumpet (1999–2014)

Discography

Studio albums

Live albums

Compilations

Singles

References

Sources

External links

DDT at Russmus
Oct 2008 News article in NG Antrakt discussing Shevchuk's activism
May 2007 Interview with Shevchuk in Religare publication
March 2004 Article on DDT in BBC News

Soviet rock music groups
Russian rock music groups
1980 establishments in Russia
Musical groups established in 1980